The Palace Theatre is an art deco theatre in Silverton, Oregon, United States. The venue is a contributing property of the NRHP-listed Silverton Commercial Historic District. Stu Rasmussen has been a co-owner since 1974.

History

The current theatre was built in 1936, replacing the Opera House, which was built during the early 1900s and screened films since 1909 but was destroyed by fire in 1935. Stu Rasmussen has co-owned the venue since 1974.

In 2012, a fire forced the venue to close temporarily and undergo a restoration. The theatre was restored to its original "glory, but with state-of-the-art 21st century entertainment technology carefully hidden away".

A replica of the theatre's marquee was part of the set of the 2013 musical about Rasmussen called Stu for Silverton.

Owners announced plans to close in 2020, during the COVID-19 pandemic. However, the theater has since re-opened.

Architecture
The theatre faces southwest diagonally on a street corner. It is built of concrete. The facade features a large chevron pattern divided by vertical stripes. A metal-constructed marquee hangs in front of the theatre, supported from the upper facade by wires.

Reception
In 2018, Justin Much of the Statesman Journal included Palace Theatre in his list of "7 essentials to Silverton's unique appeal".

References

External links

 
 Palace Theatre at CinemaTreasures.org
 Palace Theatre at Puget Sound Theatre Organ Society

1936 establishments in Oregon
Buildings and structures in Marion County, Oregon
Silverton, Oregon
Theatres completed in 1936
Theatres in Oregon